The Cabinet committee is a set of committees in the Government of Canada that are responsible for enacting the Government's agenda. The cabinet committees under Prime Minister Justin Trudeau as of January 2017 were as follows:
Agenda, Results and Communication Cabinet Committee
Canada in the World & Public Security Cabinet Committee
Canada-United States Relations Cabinet Committee
Defence Procurement Cabinet Committee
Diversity and Inclusion Cabinet Committee
Environment, Climate Change and Energy Cabinet Committee
Growing the Middle Class Cabinet Committee
Intelligence and Emergency Management Cabinet Committee
Litigation Management Cabinet Committee
Treasury Board

Former Cabinet committees
 Cabinet Committee on Security, Public Health and Emergencies, established under the Martin government

References

Government of Canada